The determination of the day of the week for any date may be performed with a variety of algorithms. In addition, perpetual calendars require no calculation by the user, and are essentially lookup tables.
A typical application is to calculate the day of the week on which someone was born or a specific event occurred.

Concepts
In numerical calculation, the days of the week are represented as weekday numbers. If Monday is the first day of the week, the days may be coded 1 to 7, for Monday through Sunday, as is practiced in ISO 8601. The day designated with 7 may also be counted as 0, by applying the arithmetic modulo 7, which calculates the remainder of a number after division by 7. Thus, the number 7 is treated as 0, 8 as 1, 9 as 2, 18 as 4 and so on. If Sunday is counted as day 1, then 7 days later (i.e. day 8) is also a Sunday, and day 18 is the same as day 4, which is a Wednesday since this falls three days after Sunday.

The basic approach of nearly all of the methods to calculate the day of the week begins by starting from an 'anchor date': a known pair (such as 1 January 1800 as a Wednesday), determining the number of days between the known day and the day that you are trying to determine, and using arithmetic modulo 7 to find a new numerical day of the week.

One standard approach is to look up (or calculate, using a known rule) the value of the first day of the week of a given century, look up (or calculate, using a method of congruence) an adjustment for the month, calculate the number of leap years since the start of the century, and then add these together along with the number of years since the start of the century, and the day number of the month. Eventually, one ends up with a day-count to which one applies modulo 7 to determine the day of the week of the date.

Some methods do all the additions first and then cast out sevens, whereas others cast them out at each step, as in Lewis Carroll's method. Either way is quite viable: the former is easier for calculators and computer programs, the latter for mental calculation (it is quite possible to do all the calculations in one's head with a little practice). None of the methods given here perform range checks, so unreasonable dates will produce erroneous results.

Corresponding days
Every seventh day in a month has the same name as the previous:

Corresponding months
"Corresponding months" are those months within the calendar year that start on the same day of the week. For example, September and December correspond, because 1 September falls on the same day as 1 December (as there are precisely thirteen 7-day weeks between the two dates). Months can only correspond if the number of days between their first days is divisible by 7, or in other words, if their first days are a whole number of weeks apart. For example, February of a common year corresponds to March because February has 28 days, a number divisible by 7, 28 days being exactly four weeks.
In a leap year, January and February correspond to different months than in a common year, since adding 29 February means each subsequent month starts a day later.

January corresponds to October in common years and April and July in leap years. February corresponds to March and November in common years and August in leap years. March always corresponds to November, April always corresponds to July, and September always corresponds to December. August does not correspond to any other month in a common year. October doesn't correspond to any other month in a leap year. May and June never correspond to any other month.

In the months table below, corresponding months have the same number, a fact which follows directly from the definition.

Corresponding years 

There are seven possible days that a year can start on, and leap years will alter the day of the week after 29 February. This means that there are 14 configurations that a year can have. All the configurations can be referenced by a dominical letter, but as 29 February has no letter allocated to it, a leap year has two dominical letters, one for January and February and the other (one step back in the alphabetical sequence) for March to December.

2021 is a common year starting on Friday, which means that it corresponds to the 2010 calendar year. The first two months of 2021 correspond to the first two months of 2016. 2022 is a common year starting on Saturday, which means that it corresponds to the 2011 calendar year. The last ten months of 2022 correspond to the last ten months of 2016. 2023 is a common year starting on Sunday, which means that it corresponds to the 2017 calendar year. 2024 is a leap year starting on Monday, which means that it corresponds to the 1996 calendar year. The first two months of 2024 correspond to the first two months of 2018. The last ten months of 2024 correspond to the last ten months of 2019. 

Each leap year repeats once every 28 years, and every common year repeats once every 6 years and twice every 11 years. For instance, the last occurrence of a leap year starting on Wednesday was 2020 and the next occurrence will be 2048. Likewise, the next common years starting on Friday will be 2027, 2038, and then 2049. Both of these statements are true unless a leap year is skipped, but that will not happen until 2100. 

For details see the table below.

Notes:

 Black means all the months of Common Year
 Red means the first 2 months of Leap Year
 Blue means the last 10 months of Leap Year

Corresponding centuries

"Year 000" is, in normal chronology, the year 1 BC (which precedes AD 1). In astronomical year numbering the year 0 comes between 1 BC and AD 1. In the proleptic Julian calendar, (that is, the Julian calendar as it would have been if it had been operated correctly from the start), 1 BC starts on Thursday. In the proleptic Gregorian calendar, (so called because it wasn't devised until 1582), 1 BC starts on Saturday.

Tabular methods to calculate the day of the week

Complete table: Julian and Gregorian calendars
For Julian dates before 1300 and after 1999 the year in the table which differs by an exact multiple of 700 years should be used. For Gregorian dates after 2299, the year in the table which differs by an exact multiple of 400 years should be used. The values "" through "" indicate the remainder when the Hundreds value is divided by 7 and 4 respectively, indicating how the series extend in either direction. Both Julian and Gregorian values are shown 1500-1999 for convenience. Bold figures (e.g., 04) denote leap year. If a year ends in 00 and its hundreds are in bold it is a leap year. Thus 19 indicates that 1900 is not a Gregorian leap year, (but 19 in the Julian column indicates that it is a Julian leap year, as are all Julian x00 years). 20 indicates that 2000 is a leap year. Use Jan and Feb only in leap years.

For determination of the day of the week (1 January 2000, Saturday)
the day of the month: 1 ~ 31 (1)
the month: (6)
the year: (0)
the century mod 4 for the Gregorian calendar and mod 7 for the Julian calendar (0).
adding 1+6+0+0=7. Dividing by 7 leaves a remainder of 0, so the day of the week is Saturday.

The formula is w = (d + m + y + c) mod 7.

Revised Julian calendar
Note that the date (and hence the day of the week) in the Revised Julian and Gregorian calendars is the same from 14 October 1923 to 28 February AD 2800 inclusive and that for large years it may be possible to subtract 6300 or a multiple thereof before starting so as to reach a year which is within or closer to the table.

To look up the weekday of any date for any year using the table, subtract 100 from the year, divide the difference by 100, multiply the resulting quotient (omitting fractions) by seven and divide the product by nine. Note the quotient (omitting fractions). Enter the table with the Julian year, and just before the final division add 50 and subtract the quotient noted above.

Example: What is the day of the week of 27 January 8315?

8315−6300=2015, 2015−100=1915, 1915/100=19 remainder 15, 19×7=133, 133/9=14 remainder 7. 2015 is 700 years ahead of 1315, so 1315 is used. From table: for hundreds (13): 6. For remaining digits (15): 4. For month (January): 0. For date (27): 27. . 73/7=10 remainder 3. Day of week = Tuesday.

Dominical Letter
To find the Dominical Letter, calculate the day of the week for either 1 January or 1 October. If it is Sunday, the Dominical Letter is A, if Saturday B, and similarly backwards through the week and forwards through the alphabet to Monday, which is G.

Leap years have two Sunday Letters, so for January and February calculate the day of the week for 1 January and for March to December calculate the day of the week for 1 October.

Leap years are all years which divide exactly by four with the following exceptions:

In the Gregorian calendar – all years which divide exactly by 100 (other than those which divide exactly by 400).

In the Revised Julian calendar – all years which divide exactly by 100 (other than those which give remainder 200 or 600 when divided by 900).

The "doomsday" 

This is an artefact of recreational mathematics. See doomsday rule for an explanation.

Check the result 
Use this table for finding the day of the week without any calculations.

Examples:
For common method
26 December 1893 (GD)
December is in row F and 26 is in column E, so the letter for the date is C located in row F and column E. 93 (year mod 100) is in row D (year row) and the letter C in the year row is located in column G. 18 ([year/100] in the Gregorian century column) is in row C (century row) and the letter in the century row and column G is B, so the day of the week is Tuesday.
13 October 1307 (JD)
October 13 is a F day. The letter F in the year row (07) is located in column G. The letter in the century row (13) and column G is E, so the day of the week is Friday.
1 January 2000 (GD)
January 1 corresponds to G, G in the year row (00) corresponds to F in the century row (20), and F corresponds to Saturday.

A pithy formula for the method: "Date letter (G), letter (G) is in year row (00) for the letter (F) in century row (20), and for the day, the letter (F) become weekday (Saturday)".

The Sunday Letter method

Each day of the year (other than 29 February) has a letter allocated to it in the recurring sequence ABCDEFG. The series begins with A on 1 January and continues to A again on 31 December. The Sunday letter is the one which stands against all the Sundays in the year. Since 29 February has no letter, this means that the Sunday Letter for March to December is one step back in the sequence compared to that for January and February. The letter for any date will be found where the row containing the month (in black) at the left of the "Latin square" meets the column containing the date above the "Latin square". The Sunday letter will be found where the column containing the century (below the "Latin square") meets the row containing the year's last two digits to the right of the "Latin square". For a leap year, the Sunday letter thus found is the one which applies to March to December.

So, for example, to find the weekday of 16 June 2020:

Column "20" meets row "20" at "D". Row "June" meets column "16" at "F". As F is two letters on from D, so the weekday is two days on from Sunday, i.e. Tuesday.

Mathematical algorithms

Rata Die
The trivial Rata Die method works by adding up the number of days  that has passed since a date of known day of the week .

This method is more expensive than needed, and is not practical for human calculation. IBM has used a Rata Die method in its REXX programming language, using the known base date of 1 January, AD 1, a Monday.

For example, the date of 13 August 2009 is 733632 days from January AD 1. Taking the number mod 7 yields 4, hence a Thursday.

Gauss's algorithm
Carl Friedrich Gauss described a method for calculating the day of the week for 1 January in any given year in a handwritten note in a collection of astronomical tables. He never published it. It was finally included in his collected works in 1927. Compared to Rata Die, the result helps simplify the counting of years.

Gauss' method was applicable to the Gregorian calendar. He numbered the weekdays from 0 to 6 starting with Sunday. He defined the following operation.

 Inputs
 Year number , month number , day number .
 Output
 Day of year.
 Procedure
 First determine the day-of-week  of 1 January.
 Return .

The above procedure can be condensed into a single expression for the Gregorian case:

Worked example 

The weekdays for 30 April 1777 and 23 February 1855 are

and

Explanation and notes 
The algorithm for the day-of-week of 1 Jan can be proven using modulo arithmetic. The main point is that because , each year adds 1 day to the progression. The rest is adjustment for leap year. The century-based versions have .

The table of month offsets show a divergence in February due to the leap year. A common technique (later used by Zeller) is to shift the month to start with March, so that the leap day is at the tail of the counting. In addition, as later shown by Zeller, the table can be replaced with an arithmetic expression.

This formula was also converted into graphical and tabular methods for calculating any day of the week by Kraitchik and Schwerdtfeger.

Disparate variation 
The following formula is an example of a version without a lookup table. The year is assumed to begin in March, meaning dates in January and February should be treated as being part of the preceding year. The formula for the Gregorian calendar is   

 
where 

  is the day of the month (1 to 31)
  is the shifted month (March = 1,…,February = 12)
  is the year unless  is 11 = January or 12 = February which are considered part of the preceding year, giving 
  is the century given by 
  is the day of the week (0 = Sunday,…,6 = Saturday)

Zeller's algorithm 

In Zeller's algorithm, the months are numbered from 3 for March to 14 for February. The year is assumed to begin in March; this means, for example, that January 1995 is to be treated as month 13 of 1994. 
The formula for the Gregorian calendar is 

where
  is the day of the month (1 to 31)
  is the shifted month (March=3,...January = 13, February=14)
  is the year unless  is 13 = January or 14 = February which are considered part of the preceding year giving 
  is the century given by 
  is the day of week (1 = Sunday,..0 = Saturday)

 
  (March = 3 in  but March = 1 in )

Wang's algorithm 
Wang's algorithm for human calculation of the Gregorian calendar is (the formula should be subtracted by 1 if m is 1 or 2 if the year is a leap year)

where
  is the last digit of the year (units)
  is the second last digit of the year (tens)
  is the century, given by 
  is the day of the month (1 to 31)
  is the month (January=1,…,December=12)
  is the day of the week (0=Sunday,…,6=Saturday)
  is the null-days function (month offset) with values listed in the following table

An algorithm for the Julian calendar can be derived from the algorithm above

where  is a doomsday.

Other algorithms

Schwerdtfeger's method 
In a partly tabular method by Schwerdtfeger, the year is split into the century and the two digit year within the century. The approach depends on the month. For ,

so  is between 0 and 99. For ,

The formula for the day of the week is

where the positive modulus is chosen.

For the Gregorian calendar,

For the Julian calendar,

Lewis Carroll's method

Charles Lutwidge Dodgson (Lewis Carroll) devised a method resembling a puzzle, yet partly tabular in using the same index numbers for the months as in the "Complete table: Julian and Gregorian calendars" above. He lists the same three adjustments for the first three months of non-leap years, one 7 higher for the last, and gives cryptic instructions for finding the rest; his adjustments for centuries are to be determined using formulas similar to those for the centuries table. Although explicit in asserting that his method also works for Old Style dates, his example reproduced below to determine that "1676, February 23" is a Wednesday only works on a Julian calendar which starts the year on January 1, instead of March 25 as on the "Old Style" Julian calendar.

Algorithm:
Take the given date in 4 portions, viz. the number of centuries, the number of years over, the month, the day of the month.

Compute the following 4 items, adding each, when found, to the total of the previous items. When an item or total exceeds 7, divide by 7, and keep the remainder only.

Century-item: For 'Old Style' (which ended 2 September 1752) subtract from 18. For 'New Style' (which began 14 September 1752) divide by 4, take overplus [surplus] from 3, multiply remainder by 2.

Year-item: Add together the number of dozens, the overplus, and the number of 4s in the overplus.

Month-item: If it begins or ends with a vowel, subtract the number, denoting its place in the year, from 10. This, plus its number of days, gives the item for the following month. The item for January is "0"; for February or March, "3"; for December, "12".

Day-item: The total, thus reached, must be corrected, by deducting "1" (first adding 7, if the total be "0"), if the date be January or February in a leap year, remembering that every year, divisible by 4, is a Leap Year, excepting only the century-years, in `New Style', when the number of centuries is not so divisible (e.g. 1800).

The final result gives the day of the week, "0" meaning Sunday, "1" Monday, and so on.

Examples:

1783, September 18
17, divided by 4, leaves "1" over; 1 from 3 gives "2"; twice 2 is "4".
83 is 6 dozen and 11, giving 17; plus 2 gives 19, i.e. (dividing by 7) "5". Total 9, i.e. "2"
The item for August is "8 from 10", i.e. "2"; so, for September, it is "2 plus 31", i.e. "5" Total 7, i.e. "0", which goes out.
18 gives "4". Answer, "Thursday".

1676, February 23
16 from 18 gives "2"
76 is 6 dozen and 4, giving 10; plus 1 gives 11, i.e. "4".
Total "6"
The item for February is "3". Total 9, i.e. "2"
23 gives "2". Total "4"
Correction for Leap Year gives "3". Answer, "Wednesday".

Since 23 February 1676 (counting February as the second month) is, for Carroll, the same day as Gregorian 4 March 1676, he fails to arrive at the correct answer, namely "Friday," for an Old Style date that on the Gregorian calendar is the same day as 5 March 1677. Had he correctly assumed the year to begin on the 25th of March, his method would have accounted for differing year numbers—just like George Washington's birthday differs—between the two calendars.

It is noteworthy that those who have republished Carroll's method have failed to point out his error, most notably Martin Gardner.

In 1752, the British Empire abandoned its use of the Old Style Julian calendar upon adopting the Gregorian calendar, which has become today's standard in most countries of the world. For more background, see Old Style and New Style dates.

Methods in computer code

Keith 
In the C language expressions below, y, m and d are, respectively, integer variables representing the year (e.g., 1988), month (1-12) and day of the month (1-31).  
(d+=m<3?y--:y-2,23*m/9+d+4+y/4-y/100+y/400)%7  
In 1990, Michael Keith and Tom Craver published the foregoing expression that seeks to minimize the number of keystrokes needed to enter a self-contained function for converting a Gregorian date into a numerical day of the week. It returns 0 = Sunday, 1 = Monday, etc. This expression uses a less cumbersome month component than does Zeller's algorithm.

Shortly afterwards, Hans Lachman streamlined their algorithm for ease of use on low-end devices. As designed originally for four-function calculators, his method needs fewer keypad entries by limiting its range either to A.D. 1905–2099, or to historical Julian dates. It was later modified to convert any Gregorian date, even on an abacus. On Motorola 68000-based devices, there is similarly less need of either processor registers or opcodes, depending on the intended design objective.

Sakamoto's methods
The tabular forerunner to Tøndering's algorithm is embodied in the following K&R C function. With minor changes, it was adapted for other high level programming languages such as APL2. Posted by Tomohiko Sakamoto on the comp.lang.c Usenet newsgroup in 1992, it is accurate for any Gregorian date.
dayofweek(y, m, d)	/* 1 <= m <= 12,  y > 1752 (in the U.K.) */
{
    static int t[] = {0, 3, 2, 5, 0, 3, 5, 1, 4, 6, 2, 4};
    if ( m < 3 )
    {
        y -= 1;
    }
    return (y + y/4 - y/100 + y/400 + t[m-1] + d) % 7;
}
It returns 0 = Sunday, 1 = Monday, etc.

Sakamoto also simultaneously posted a more obfuscated version:
dow(m,d,y) { y-=m<3; return(y+y/4-y/100+y/400+"-bed=pen+mad."[m]+d)%7; }

This version encodes the month offsets in the string and as a result requires a computer that uses standard ASCII to run the algorithm correctly, reducing its portability. In addition, both algorithms omit  type declarations, which is allowed in the original K&R C but not allowed in ANSI C.

Sakamoto's is somewhere between the Disparate Gaussian and the Schwerdtfeger's algorithm, apparently unaware of the expression form.)

Gauss' in MATLAB 

% example date input
y1=2022
m1=1
d1=1

month_offset=[0 3 3 6 1 4 6 2 5 0 3 5]; % common year

% offset if y1 leap year
if mod(y1,4)==0 && mod(y1,100)==0 && mod(y1,400)==0
   month_offset=[0 3 4 0 2 5 0 3 6 1 4 6]; % leap year
end

% Gregor
weekday_gregor=rem( d1+month_offset(m1) + 5*rem(y1-1,4) + 4*rem(y1-1,100) + 6*rem(y1-1,400),7)

% Julian
weekday_julian=rem(6+5*rem(y1-1,4) + 3*(y1-1),7)

0: Sunday 1: Monday .. 6: Saturday

See also

 Doomsday rule
 Julian day
 Mental Calculation World Cup (Has a calendar calculation contest)
 Perpetual calendar
 Buddhist calendar

References

Notes

Citations

Further reading

External links
 Tøndering's algorithm for both Gregorian and Julian calendars
 "Key Day" method used so as to reduce computation & memorization
 Compact tabular method for memorisation, also for the Julian calendar
 When countries changed from the Julian calendar
 World records for mentally calculating the day of the week in the Gregorian Calendar 
 National records for finding Calendar Dates
 World Ranking of Memoriad Mental Calendar Dates (all competitions combined)
 Identify the year by given month, day, day of week.

determination
Gregorian calendar
Julian calendar
Calendar algorithms
Articles with example C code